McKittrick Farmers Mercantile is a historic commercial building located at McKittrick, Montgomery County, Missouri.  It was built about 1897, and is two-story, brick building on a concrete foundation.  The building historically served as a social and commercial center for the community.

It was listed on the National Register of Historic Places in 2004.

References

External links
McKittrick Farmers Mercantile

Commercial buildings on the National Register of Historic Places in Missouri
Commercial buildings completed in 1897
Buildings and structures in Montgomery County, Missouri
National Register of Historic Places in Montgomery County, Missouri
1897 establishments in Missouri